Cobbinshaw is a small hamlet in West Lothian, Scotland.  It is at the end of a dead end road from nearby Woolfords.

Nearby villages include Woolfords, Auchengray and Tarbrax. It is next to Cobbinshaw Reservoir, built in 1818 to supply water for the Union Canal.

History
 
In 1685 Walter Lord Torphichen sold the lands of Camilty and north and south Cobbinshaw to William Tennant.

Transport
It once had its own railway station on the Caledonian Railway's Edinburgh to Carstairs Line. The station was located north of Auchengray railway station.

References 
Papers of Lord Torphichen in the National Archives of Scotland GD119/405

External links

Museum of the Scottish shale oil industry - Cobbinshaw South Village
Vision of Britain - Cobbinshaw

Villages in West Lothian